Nyíregyháza Spartacus FC is a Hungarian professional football club based in Nyíregyháza, Szabolcs-Szatmár-Bereg County.

Key

Nemzeti Bajnokság I
 Pld = Matches played
 W = Matches won
 D = Matches drawn
 L = Matches lost
 GF = Goals for
 GA = Goals against
 Pts = Points
 Pos = Final position

Hungarian football league system
 NBI = Nemzeti Bajnokság I 
 NBII = Nemzeti Bajnokság II 
 NBIII = Nemzeti Bajnokság III 
 MBI = Megyei Bajnokság I 

Magyar Kupa
 F = Final
 SF = Semi-finals
 QF = Quarter-finals
 R16 = Round of 16
 R32 = Round of 32
 R64 = Round of 64
 R128 = Round of 128

UEFA
 F = Final
 SF = Semi-finals
 QF = Quarter-finals
 Group = Group stage
 PO = Play-offs
 QR3 = Third qualifying round
 QR2 = Second qualifying round
 QR1 = First qualifying round
 PR = Preliminary round

Seasons

Notes
Note 1: Although Nyíregyháza finished 12th in the 2014-15 Nemzeti Bajnokság I season, they were relegated due to license problems.
Note 2: The 2019–20 Nemzeti Bajnokság II was suspended due to the COVID-19 pandemic.
* The 2000–01 featured a new format involving 2 groups of 8 who played each other twice for 14 games. The top 6 teams in each group went on to form a new group of 12, whereas the bottom 4 teams were relegated.

References

Nyíregyháza Spartacus FC
Nyíregyháza Spartacus